Igreja de São Francisco may refer to:

 Igreja de São Francisco (Estremoz)
 Igreja de São Francisco (Évora)
 Igreja de São Francisco (Porto)